Marco Marchei (born 2 August 1954 in Castignano, Ascoli Piceno) is a retired male long-distance runner from Italy.

Biography
He twice competed for his native country at the Summer Olympics: in 1980 and 1984. Marchei set his personal best (2:11.47) in the men's marathon on 14 August 1983 at the World Championships.  He is the father of Valentina Marchei.

Achievements
All results regarding marathon, unless stated otherwise

References

External links
 

1954 births
Living people
Italian male long-distance runners
Italian male marathon runners
Athletes (track and field) at the 1980 Summer Olympics
Athletes (track and field) at the 1984 Summer Olympics
Olympic athletes of Italy
Mediterranean Games silver medalists for Italy
Athletes (track and field) at the 1979 Mediterranean Games
World Athletics Championships athletes for Italy
Mediterranean Games medalists in athletics